RAF Iceland is a former Royal Air Force command which controlled RAF units within Iceland.

The command was operational between July 1941 and July 1945 during the Second World War, the unit was previously No. 30 Wing RAF.

The command controlled the Iceland Ferry Control Unit which was formed at Reykjavik on 11 August 1942.

History of No. 30 Wing RAF

No. 30 Wing RAF as formed as 29th (Training) Wing RFC on 1 June 1917 at Edinburgh controlling Montrose Aerodrome and Turnhouse Aerodrome. On the formation of the Royal Air Force it was transferred to 21st Group RAF and moved to Montrose on 22 July 1918. The wing was disbanded during October 1918.

The wing was reformed on 22 March 1941 as No. 30 (Coastal) Wing RAF at RAF Reykjavik and became RAF Iceland on 2 July 1941.

References

Citations

Bibliography

Iceland
Military units and formations of the United Kingdom